The 1987–88 Elitserien season was the 13th season of the Elitserien, the top level of ice hockey in Sweden. 12 teams participated in the league, and Farjestads BK won the championship.

Standings

First round

Final round

Playoffs

External links
 Swedish Hockey official site

Swe
1987–88 in Swedish ice hockey
Swedish Hockey League seasons